Prosopalpus debilis, the western dwarf skipper, is a butterfly in the family Hesperiidae. It is found in Senegal, Guinea, Sierra Leone, Liberia, Ivory Coast, Ghana, western Nigeria, Cameroon, Gabon, Ethiopia, north-western Tanzania and northern Zambia. The habitat consists of forests.

References

Butterflies described in 1879
Erionotini
Butterflies of Africa